The 2012 Orlando City SC season was the club's second season of existence. It is City's second consecutive year in the third tier of American soccer, playing in the USL Professional Division for their second season. In the 2011 season, Orlando City won the regular season and the playoffs. As of the 1 March 2012, there are approximately 3,500 season ticket holders for the 2012 season.
They ended the season with winning the league title for the second consecutive year, but they lost in the Playoffs to the Wilmington Hammerheads in the Semi-final 3–4.

Background 

In October 2010, the Orlando Pro Soccer USL rights were purchased by Phil Rawlins, who moved the Austin Aztex organization to Orlando, and the team was announced on October 25, 2010. Rawlins has stated that he intends to bring a Major League Soccer franchise to Orlando "within 3–5 years". Rawlins was able to bring international matches to the city in 2011 when Orlando played English Premier League sides Bolton Wanderers and Newcastle United. Rawlins is President and majority owner and Adrian Heath is the manager.

Competitions

Friendlies 

Orlando City originally agreed to play Nottingham Forest F.C. on July 21, 2012. However, this match was canceled when Forest sacked their manager, Steve Cotterill. The team also canceled a friendly with Charleston Battery, forgoing their American tour altogether.

WDW Pro Soccer Classic

USL Pro 

All times from this point on Eastern Daylight Time (UTC−04:00)

Results summary

Results

Standings

USL Pro Playoffs

U.S. Open Cup 

As part of the new format for the U.S. Open Cup in 2012, Orlando City entered with the other U.S.-based teams from USL Pro and the NASL in the second round. The first two rounds were drawn on May 1, 2012, and the third round was drawn on May 16, 2012.

Club

Roster

Squad information 

* = Denotes players who were retained after the move of the Austin Aztex FC organization to form Orlando City S.C.

Transfers

In 
  Matt Luzunaris was signed on free transfer on December 4, 2011. The forward was originally loaned to the Lions by San Jose Earthquakes of Major League Soccer for a few games during the 2011 season and scored two goals, including one in their friendly against Bolton Wanderers F.C. The 22-year-old native of Margate, Florida (near Fort Lauderdale), spent a year with UCF in 2007 before being signed to teams in Austria and spending three years there.
  James O'Connor was signed on free transfer on January 10, 2012. The Irish midfielder spent 15 years playing in England, and most recently played for Sheffield Wednesday F.C. of Football League One.
  Anthony Pulis was transferred from Aldershot Town F.C. on January 17, 2012. The Welsh midfielder has been loaned to various clubs throughout England.
  John Rooney was signed to the team on January 26, 2012. The younger brother of Manchester United's Wayne Rooney, he is a Liverpool native and has played most recently with the New York Red Bulls of the MLS.
  Justin Clark was signed by Orlando City on April 4, 2012. The defender played for local Rollins College where he was named the 2011 Defender of the Year for the Sunshine State Conference.
  Kyle Davies was signed by Orlando City on April 5, 2012 after having been waived by Toronto FC in November 2011.
  Jhohan Obando was signed to a short-term contract in early April to serve as Kelley’s back-up during Gallardo's suspension from the red card he received in the championship game.
  Nick Sowers was signed by Orlando City on April 20, 2012. The midfielder joins fellow Rollins alumni Justin Clark and Dennis Chin. Sowers if from Longwood, Florida and played at Lake Mary High School. Nick is currently on loan to Orlando City U-23.
  Adama Mbengue was signed by Orlando City on June 21, 2012. The midfielder was promoted from Orlando City U-23 to Orlando City, becoming the first player from U-23 to be promoted to the pro squad.
  Rodrigo López was signed by Orlando City on July 5, 2012. The midfielder has played most recently with the Ventura County Fusion of the PDL.

Out 
  Lawrence Olum was signed as a free agent in September 2011 by Sporting Kansas City. The midfielder had 21 appearances with Orlando City in 2011 scoring 1 goal.
  Jack Traynor signed with the Rochester Rhinos on November 28, 2011. Traynor logged 1,298 minutes in 17 appearances for Orlando City in 2011.
  Yordany Álvarez was signed on a transfer from Orlando City in January 2012. At the end of the 2011 season, Álvarez joined Real Salt Lake on a loan agreement which included an option for Salt Lake to purchase Álvarez.
  Devorn Jorsling returned to Trinidad where he played for the national team and Caledonia AIA.
  Lewis Neal was signed by D.C. United on March 13, 2012 after having been on loan from Orlando City.
  Justin Fojo is no longer listed on the Orlando City Roster, after a move in 2012 to the Puerto Rico Islanders. 
  Demar Stewart is no longer listed on the Orlando City Roster

Loan in 
  Jean Alexandre was loaned from the San Jose Earthquakes on 7 June 2012, for a short-term loan for the next two games. on 6 July 2012, Alexandre re-joined Orlando City again for a short-term loan for the next two games which the two games will be against the Los Angeles Blues. On 23 July 2012, he returned again for the remainder of the 2012 USL Pro season.   
  George Davis IV was loaned from the Los Angeles Blues in exchange for Maxwell Griffin, the loan will be through the end of the 2012 USL Pro season.

Loan out 
  Lewis Neal was on trial with Real Salt Lake and released on 16 February 2012.
  Lewis Neal was on trial with D.C. United. until D.C. United signed him on March 13, 2012
  Maxwell Griffin was on loan to Los Angeles Blues in exchange for George Davis IV, the loan will be through the end of the 2012 USL Pro season.
  Jamie Watson is on loan to Minnesota Stars FC for the remainder of the 2012 NASL season.

See also 
 2012 in American soccer
 2012 USL Pro season
 Orlando City

References 

2012 USL Pro season
2012
American soccer clubs 2012 season
2012 in sports in Florida